Almel is a New Taluk of Vijayapura District Karnataka, India.

Geography
It has an average elevation of 516 metres (1693 feet). It is major market hub for near by villages. The location of Almel is very strategic & accessible by road. It is major junction to reach or divert the routes to Bijapur, Indi, Gulbarga, Sindagi, Afzalpur, Bidar & Solapur.

Demographics
 India census, Almel had a population of 18,667 with 9,454 Males and 9,213 Females.

See also
Bijapur
Districts of Karnataka
Sindagi
Muddebihal
Bengaluru

References

External links

Villages in Bijapur district, Karnataka